Trzebnica is a town in Lower Silesian Voivodeship in west-central Poland. It is the seat of Trzebnica County, and of the smaller administrative district (gmina) called Gmina Trzebnica.

It is part of the Wrocław metropolitan area. As of 2019, it has a population of 13,331.

Trzebnica's Sanctuary of St. Jadwiga is one of the historical burial sites of Polish monarchs and consorts.

In 2017, the town was the co-host of the World Games (orienteering, middle distance).

History

Middle Ages
In the 12th century, the area was among the possessions of the Premonstratensian St. Vincent monastery at Wrocław. Trzebnica itself was first mentioned in an 1138 deed, then held by the Polish voivode Piotr Włostowic and later seized by the Silesian duke Władysław II the Exile. As a result of the fragmentation of Poland it was part of the Silesian province of Poland.

In 1202 Władysław's grandson Duke Henry I the Bearded and his wife Hedwig of Andechs founded a Cistercian convent, present-day Sanctuary of St. Jadwiga in Trzebnica, the first in Poland. The couple signed the deed of donation on 23 June 1203 in the presence of Hedwig's brother Ekbert Bishop of Bamberg; the monastery was settled with German nuns descending from Bamberg in Franconia. In 1218 Hedwig's daughter Gertrude became abbess of Trzebnica, the first of many Piast princesses to hold this office. After Duke Henry died in 1238 and was buried in the church, his widow moved to the Cistercian convent which by now was led by her daughter. Hedwig died in October 1243 and was buried there also, while some of her relics are preserved at Andechs Abbey in Bavaria, she was canonized in 1267.

In 1250 Trzebnica received town privileges, it passed under the jurisdiction of the Lower Silesian Duchy of Oleśnica in 1323, a Bohemian fief from 1328. In 1480 Duke Konrad X the White granted the town to the Cistercian abbey. Town and monastery were devastated several times, by fires as well as by the plague, but also by Hussite troops in 1430.

Modern era
During the Thirty Years' War, the town was plundered by Swedish forces and the nuns had to flee across the border to nearby Poland. After the war the premises were rebuilt in its present Baroque style. In the 17th century Trzebnica belonged to the Polish-speaking area in Silesia.

In 1742 Trzebnica (as Trebnitz) with most of Silesia was annexed by the Kingdom of Prussia and the monastery was finally securalized in 1810. Meanwhile, the town had become a centre of cloth manufacturing. In 1870 the Order of Saint John acquired the former abbey's estates to establish a hospital, cared for by the Sisters of Mercy of St. Borromeo up to today. Between 1871 and 1945 the town was part of Germany. It was heavily damaged during the Vistula–Oder Offensive of the Red Army in the last days of World War II.

After Nazi Germany's defeat in World War II, the town once again became part of Poland. The local population was expelled and replaced by ethnic Poles. From April to June 1945, Trzebnica (instead of Wrocław) was the first post-war regional capital of the Lower Silesian (Wrocław) Voivodeship.

Notable people
 Saint Agnes of Bohemia (1211–1282), daughter of King Ottokar I of Bohemia, educated at Trzebnica Abbey
 Przemysł I of Greater Poland (1220/21–1257), Duke of Greater Poland
 Euphrosyne of Greater Poland (1247/50–1298), daughter of Duke Przemysł I of Greater Poland, abbess of Trzebnica from 1278
Jan Willenberg (1571–1613), author of woodcuts, prints and drawings active in Moravia and Bohemia.
 Marie Leszczyńska (1703–1768), Polish princess, daughter of King Stanisław I Leszczyński of Poland, queen consort of France (born here)
 Ernst Niekisch (1889–1967), German politician and exponent of National Bolshevism (born here)
 Gila von Weitershausen (born 1944), German actress
 Ireneusz Mamrot (born 1970), Polish football coach
 Krzysztof Ulatowski (born 1980), former Polish footballer

Twin towns – sister cities
See twin towns of Gmina Trzebnica.

References

External links

 Jewish Community in Trzebnica on Virtual Shtetl

Populated places established in the 13th century
Cities and towns in Lower Silesian Voivodeship
Trzebnica County